This list of town walls in England and Wales describes the fortified walls built and maintained around these towns and cities from the 1st century AD onwards. The first town walls were built by the Romans, following their conquest of Britain in 43 AD. The Romans typically initially built walled forts, some of which were later converted into rectangular towns, protected by either wooden or stone walls and ditches. Many of these defences survived the fall of the Roman Empire in the 4th and 5th centuries, and were used in the unstable post-Roman period. The Anglo-Saxon kings undertook significant planned urban expansion in the 8th and 9th centuries, creating burhs, often protected with earth and wood ramparts. These burh walls sometimes utilised older Roman fortifications, and themselves frequently survived into the early medieval period.

The Norman invaders of the 11th century initially focused on building castles to control their new territories, rather than town walls to defend the urban centres, but by the 12th century many new town walls were built across England and Wales, typically in stone. Edward I conquered North Wales in the late 13th century and built a number of walled towns as part of a programme of English colonisation. By the late medieval period, town walls were increasingly less military in character and more closely associated with civic pride and urban governance: many grand gatehouses were built in the 14th and 15th centuries. The English Civil War in 1640s saw many town walls pressed back into service, with older medieval structures frequently reinforced with more modern earthwork bastions and sconces. By the 18th century, however, most town walls were falling into disrepair: typically they were sold off and demolished, or hidden behind newer buildings as towns and cities expanded.

In the 20th century there was a resurgence in historical and cultural interest in these defences. Those towns and cities that still had intact walls renovated them to form tourist attractions. Some of Edward I's town walls in North Wales were declared part of the internationally recognised UNESCO World Heritage Site. Urban redevelopment has frequently uncovered new remnants of the medieval walls, with archaeological work generating new insights into the Roman and Anglo-Saxon defences.

List
{|class="wikitable sortable" width="100%"
!width="12%"|Place
!width="10%"|County
!width="8%" |Date built
!width="10%"|Condition
!class="unsortable" width="126px"|Image
!class="unsortable"|Notes
|-
|Abergavenny
|Monmouthshire
|
|Masonry fragments
|
|A small Norman wall was built around the town in the 11th century, linked to Abergavenny Castle. This was destroyed by the modern period.
|-
|Aberystwyth
|Ceredigion
|
|Vestiges
|
|A small section of the medieval walls still remain near the castle on the seafront.
|-
|Alnwick
|Northumberland
|
|Two gatehouses survive
|
|The walls were built in the 15th century to protect Alnwick against border instability and raiding, and commemorated the powerful local Percy family, who controlled the local castle.
|-
|Bath
|Somerset
|
|Fragmentary remains
|
|Bath's first walls were built by the Romans. The Anglo-Saxons established a fortified burh at Bath, utilising the existing walls, and they were further strengthened during the medieval period. Parts of one medieval gatehouse still survive.
|-
|Beaumaris
|Anglesey
|
|Vestiges
|
|The town was captured by Owain Glyndŵr in 1400.  Once recaptured by English forces, a stone wall with three gates was built around the town, and maintained until the late 17th century.
|-
|Berwick-upon-Tweed
|Northumberland
|
|Substantially intact
|
Replaced in 1560 by a set of Italian-inspired walls with 5 large stone bastions, the walls are today the best-preserved post-medieval town defences in England.
|-
|Beverley
|East Riding of Yorkshire
|
|One gatehouse survives
|
|12th century Beverley was protected by a "great ditch" rather than a stone wall.  In the early 15th century 3 brick gatehouses were built; more ditches and other fortifications were later added, but these failed to protect the town during the Civil War.
|-
|Bolsover
|Derbyshire
|Probably 11th or 12th century.
|Vestiges
|
|Bank and ditch rampart, approximately 8m in width at the base and varying between 3m and 2m in height.
|-
|Brecon
|Powys
|
|Vestiges
|
|Originally constructed by Humphrey de Bohun after 1240, the walls were built of stone, with 4 gatehouses and 10 semi-circular bastions.  They were largely destroyed during the Civil War.
|-
|Bridgnorth
|Shropshire
|
|Vestiges
|
|Bridgnorth's town walls were initially constructed in timber between 1216 and 1223; murage grants allowed them to be upgraded to stone between the 13th and 15th centuries including 5 gates.
|-
|Bristol
|Bristol
|
|Fragmentary remains
|
|The fine St John's Gate is built into the Church of St John the Baptist under its spire; the line of the walls is walkable.
|-
|Caerleon
|Newport
|
|Fragmentary remains
|
|
|-
|Caernarfon
|Gwynedd
|
|Largely intact
|
Today they form part of the UNESCO world heritage site administered by Cadw.
|-
|Caerwent
|Monmouthshire
|
|Substantial remains
|
|
|-
|Canterbury
|Kent
|
|Substantial remains
|
|First built by the Romans in the 3rd century, retained by the Anglo-Saxons, the walls were rebuilt in the late 14th century owing to fears of a French invasion and feature early gunports.  Over half of the original circuit, with 17 out of 24 towers, survives.
|-
|Cardiff
|Cardiff
|
|Vestiges
|
Sections collapsed in the 18th century, many stones being reused as building material. The last large section was demolished in 1901. One of the town gates remains just west of the castle, the "West Gate".
|-
|Carlisle
|Cumbria
|
|Substantial remains
|
|
|-
|Castle Acre
|Norfolk
|
|Fragmentary remains
|
|
|-
|Chepstow
|Monmouthshire
|
|Substantial remains
|
|A late thirteenth century stone wall constructed for the twin purposes of defence and tax collection.
|-
|Chester
|Cheshire
|
|Largely intact
|
|Chester's walls were originally built by the Romans between 70 and 80 AD and were used by the burh in 907.
|-
|Chichester
|West Sussex
|
|Substantial remains
|
|
|-
|Cirencester
|Gloucestershire
|
|Vestiges
|
|Remnants of the stone walls of the Roman town of Corinium Dobunnorum are visible in the Abbey Grounds.
|-
|Colchester
|Essex
|
|Substantial remains
|
|The walls were built between 65 and 80 AD after the destruction of the town by Boudicca, and they continued in use until after the Siege of Colchester in 1648. Two large stretches survive on the west and north sides and a number of fragments are visible along the rest of the circuit nearly 2 miles (3.2 kilometres). The Balkerne Gate is the most complete Roman gateway in the United Kingdom.
|-
|Conwy
|Conwy
|
|Largely intact
|
|-
|Coventry
|West Midlands
|
|Fragmentary remains
|
retrieved 1 October  2008.</ref>
|-
|Cowbridge
|Vale of Glamorgan
|
|Substantial remains
|
|
|-
|Cricklade
|Wiltshire
|
|Fragmentary remains
|
|
|-
|Denbigh
|Denbighshire
|
|Substantial remains
|
|
|-
|Dover
|Kent
|
|Vestiges
|
|Medieval town walls, probably 14th century in date. No structures survive above ground. Tablets mark the sites of Snar Gate, Cow Gate, and Biggin Gate. During building clearance in 1962, foundations of the town wall were encountered along the south side of Townwall Street.
|-
|Durham
|County Durham
|
|Fragmentary remains
|
|
|-
|Exeter
|Devon
|
|Substantial remains
|
|Exeter's walls survive as a circuit approximately 2.35 km long, of which 72% (1,705m) is still visible, some parts up to 2.5m high. Originally built by the Romans in circa 200 AD, there were four gateways which were dismantled in the 18th and 19th centuries. The walls were repaired and rebuilt during the Anglo-Saxon, medieval and Civil War periods and the city was besieged at least twice. Several turrets and bastions in the wall are of uncertain date.
|-
|Frome
|Somerset
|Pre 1730
|Substantial Remains
|
|One of Frome's most ancient structures, the Old Town Wall, runs along from Bath Street through into upper Saxonvale below Lidl, whilst the Old Slaughterhouse facade with its blocked in coach arches and mixture of dressed and rubble stone sections is architecturally of significance in assessing the surviving fabric of previous barton buildings.
|-
|Gloucester
|Gloucestershire
|Roman and medieval
|Vestiges
|
|Foundations of 11th and 13th century East Gate visible through glass panels in Eastgate Street. Another fragment of Roman wall is visible in the City Museum.
|-
|Great Yarmouth
|Norfolk
|
|Substantial remains
|
|
|-
|Hartlepool
|County Durham
|
|Substantial remains
|
|
|-
|Hastings
|East Sussex
|
|Vestiges
|
|
|-
|Haverfordwest
|Pembrokeshire
|
|Vestiges
|
|
|-
|Hay-on-Wye
|Powys
|
|Vestiges
|
|
|-
|Hereford
|Herefordshire
|
|Fragmentary remains
|
|
|-
|Horncastle
|Lincolnshire
|Circa 300 AD
|Fragmentary remains
|
|Perhaps part of a 4th-century Roman coastal defence system. Remnants of all four walls and a circular bastion survive.
|-
|Ilchester
|Somerset
|
|Vestiges
|
|
|-
|Kidwelly
|Carmarthenshire
|
|Substantial remains
|
|
|-
|Kings Lynn
|Norfolk
|
|Fragmentary remains
|
|
|-
|Kingston upon Hull
|East Riding of Yorkshire
|
|Vestiges
|
|Built of brick in the 14th century, with 4 main gates and up to 30 towers, the walls were maintained until the early 1700s.  They were demolished during the building of the docks, beginning in the 1770s.
|-
|Langport
|Somerset
|
|Fragmentary remains
|
|
|-
|Launceston
|Cornwall
|
|Substantial remains
|
|
|-
|Lewes
|East Sussex
|
|Vestiges
|
|
|-
|Lincoln
|Lincolnshire
|
|Fragmentary remains
|
|
|-
|London
|London
|
|Fragmentary remains
|
Short sections remain near the Tower of London and in the Barbican area.
|-
|Ludlow
|Shropshire
|
|Fragmentary remains
|
|Built to defend this Welsh Marches market town, the walls remain in sections, as does the Broad Gate (shown in photo).  The large Ludlow Castle is now a ruin but with substantial remains.
|-
|Malmesbury
|Wiltshire
|
|Vestiges
|
|
|-
|Monmouth
|Monmouthshire
|
|Only the Monnow Bridge gate survives
|
|Originally formed a circuit wall with four gatehouses, none of which survive. The fortified Monnow bridge still remains, the only surviving medieval bridge gate in the UK.
|-
|Newark-on-Trent
|Nottinghamshire
|
|Vestiges
|
|
|-
|Newcastle upon Tyne
|Tyne and Wear
|
|Substantial remains
|
The town was successfully defended twice; but during the Civil War the wall was breached using mines and artillery.
|-
|Northampton
|Northamptonshire
|
|
|
|Destroyed by Royal order in 1662
|-
|Norwich
|Norfolk
|
|Fragmentary remains
|
|
|-
|Nottingham
|Nottinghamshire
|
|Vestiges
|
|A fragment of the wall is visible in a hotel complex near Chapel Bar.
|-
|Oxford
|Oxfordshire
|
|Fragmentary remains
|
|
|-
|Pembroke
|Pembrokeshire
|11th - 13th century
|Castle and town walls largely intact
|
|A medieval town sitting atop a limestone peninsular linked to Pembroke Castle (1093). (Listed Ancient Monument).The walls are virtually intact on the north side along the River Pembroke together with the intact structure to the east that is Barnard's Tower (mini fortress). 75% of walls survive along the south side (The Commons) including a Lime-kiln, Gun Platform, two towers, the top of one surmounted by a Gazebo. All the walls are listed and many buildings on the wall and in the town are listed Ancient Monuments. The burgage plots within the town are divided by medieval stone walls and are of national importance.The mighty Pembroke Castle sits at the Western tip of the peninsular.The walk around the castle and town walls is some 1.5 miles.
|-
|Poole
|Dorset
|
|Vestiges
|
|
|-
|Portsmouth
|Hampshire
|
|Fragmentary remains
|
|First constructed of earth and timber, probably in the late 14th century, the walls were repeatedly repaired and rebuilt until the mid 18th century.  They were largely removed in the 1870s and 80s.
|-
|Richmond
|North Yorkshire
|
|Fragmentary remains
|
|
|-
|Rochester
|Kent
|
|Fragmentary remains
|
|
|-
|Rye, East Sussex
|East Sussex
|
|Substantial remains
|
|
|-
|Salisbury
|Wiltshire
|14/15th century
|Fragments and one gatehouse
|
|North Gate. Two-storey building over and around north entrance to the Cathedral Close.
|-
|Sandwich
|Kent
|
|Fragmentary remains
|
|
|-
|Shrewsbury
|Shropshire
|
|Fragmentary remains
|
|Begun in the 13th century after attacks by the Welsh, adding to the natural defences of the Severn, the walls were strengthened by the Royalists during the Civil War.  A medieval watch tower and short sections remain, notably along the street named Town Walls.
|-
|Silchester
|Hampshire
|
|Substantial remains
|
|The Roman town of Calleva Atrebatum was abandoned around the 5th or 6th century.  Much of the walls survive, the area within them largely farmland.
|-
|Southampton
|Hampshire
|
|Half the medieval circuit survives
|
They were amongst the first in England to have new technology installed to existing fortifications, with new towers built specifically to house cannon.
|-
|Stafford
|Staffordshire
|
|Vestiges
|
|
|-
|Stamford
|Lincolnshire
|
|Fragmentary remains
|
|
|-
|Swansea
|Swansea
|
|Vestiges
|
|
|-
|Tenby
|Pembrokeshire
|
|Substantial remains
|
|
|-
|Totnes
|Devon
|
|Fragmentary remains
|
|Remains include the Baste Walls, South Street and the Eastgate, which was greatly altered in the 19th century.
|-
|Verulamium
|Hertfordshire
|
|Fragmentary remains
|
|The site of the Roman town of Verulamium was abandoned when the later settlement of St. Albans was established nearby.
|-
|Warkworth
|Northumberland
|
|Fragmentary remains
|
|
|-
|Wareham
|Dorset
|9th-11th century
|Substantial remains
|
|Earthwork defences first mentioned in 876 surround the town on the north, east and west sides; the south side is bounded by the River Frome. The West Walls were scarped against attack by tanks in 1940.
|-
|Warwick
|Warwickshire
|
|Fragmentary remains
|
|
|-
|Winchelsea
|East Sussex
|
|Substantial remains
|
|
|-
|Winchester
|Hampshire
|
|Substantial remains
|
|
|-
|Worcester
|Worcestershire
|
|Vestiges
|
|First built by the Romans, the walls were extended by the Anglo-Saxons to create a walled burh.  A longer circuit of stone walls was built in the late 12th century and further fortified during the Civil War.
|-
|York
|North Yorkshire
|
|Largely intact
|
| long, enclosing an area of 263 acres, the defences are the best preserved in England. On high ramparts, retaining all their main gateways, the walls incorporate Roman, Norman and medieval work with modern renovations.
|}

See also
List of town defences in Scotland
List of cities with defensive walls

Notes

References

Bibliography
Baker, Nigel and Richard Holt. (2004) Urban Growth and the Medieval Church: Gloucester and Worcester. Aldershot, UK: Ashgate. .
Baker, Nigel, Hal Dalwood, Richard Holt, Charles Mundy and Gary Taylor. (1992) "From Roman to medieval Worcester: development and planning in the Anglo-Saxon city," Antiquity Vol. 66, pp. 65–74.
Bradley, John and Märit Gaimster. (2004) (eds) "Medieval Britain and Ireland in 2003," Medieval Archaeology Vol. 48 pp. 229–350.
Clarke, Stephen and Jane Bray. (2003) "The Norman town defences of Abergavenny," Medieval Archaeology Vol. 27, pp. 186–189.
Creighton, Oliver Hamilton and Robert Higham. (2005) Medieval Town Walls: an Archaeology and Social History of Urban Defence. Stroud, UK: Tempus. .
Forster, R. H. (1907) "The Walls of Berwick-upon-Tweed," Journal of the British Archaeological Association, Vol. 13, pp. 89–104.
Hearnshaw, F. J. C. (1924) Newcastle-upon-Tyne. London: Sheldon Press. 
Kissack, Keith. (1974) Mediaeval Monmouth. Monmouth: Monmouth Historical and Educational Trust.
Lilley, Keith D. (2010) "The Landscapes of Edward's New Towns: Their Planning and Design," in Williams and Kenyon (eds) (2010).
Mackenzie, James D. (1896) The Castles of England: Their Story and Structure, Vol II.  New York: Macmillan. .
Patterson, B. H. (1985) A Military Heritage A history of Portsmouth and Portsea Town Fortifications. Fort Cumberland & Portsmouth Militaria Society.
Pettifer, Adrian. (2000) Welsh Castles: a Guide by Counties. Woodbridge, UK: Boydell Press. .
Pettifer, Adrian. (2002) English Castles: a Guide by Counties. Woodbridge, UK: Boydell Press. .
Pevsner, Nikolaus and David Neave. (1995) Yorkshire: York and the East Riding, 2nd ed. London:  Penguin. 
Taylor, Arnold. (2008) Caernarfon Castle and Town Walls. Cardiff: Cadw. .
Turner, Hilary. (1971) Town Defences in England and Wales. London: John Baker. 
Ward, Simon. (2009) Chester: A History. Chichester, UK: Phillimore. .
Williams, Diane M. and John R. Kenyon. (eds) (2010) The Impact of the Edwardian Castles in Wales. Oxford: Oxbow Books. .
Wilson, Barbara and Frances Mee. (2005) The City Walls and Castles of York: The Pictorial Evidence'', York Archaeological Trust. .

 List
Towns
Towns
 
Welsh military-related lists
English military-related lists